Vik (also Vik i Helgeland) is the administrative centre of the municipality of Sømna in Nordland county, Norway. The local church, Sømna Church, was built here in 1876.

References

Villages in Nordland
Sømna